Carl Menger von Wolfensgrün (28 February 1840 – 26 February 1921) was an Austrian economist and the founder of the Austrian School of economics. Menger contributed to the development of the theories of marginalism and marginal utility, which rejected cost-of-production theory of value, such as developed by the classical economists such as Adam Smith and David Ricardo. As a departure from such, he would go on to call his resultant perspective, the subjective theory of value.

Biography

Family and education 
Carl Menger von Wolfensgrün was born in the city of Neu-Sandez in Galicia, Austrian Empire, which is now Nowy Sącz in Poland. He was the son of a wealthy family of minor nobility; his father, Anton Menger, was a lawyer. His mother, Caroline Gerżabek, was the daughter of a wealthy Bohemian merchant.  He had two brothers, Anton and Max, both prominent as lawyers. His son, Karl Menger, was a mathematician who taught for many years at Illinois Institute of Technology.

After attending gymnasium he studied law at the Universities of Prague and Vienna and later received a doctorate in jurisprudence from the Jagiellonian University in Kraków.

Career 
During the course of his newspaper work, he noticed a discrepancy between what the classical economics he was taught in school said about price determination and what real world market participants believed. In 1867 Menger began a study of political economy which culminated in 1871 with the publication of his Principles of Economics, thus becoming the father of the Austrian School of economic thought. It was in this work that he challenged classical cost-based theories of value with his theory of marginality – that price is determined at the margin.

In 1872 Menger was enrolled into the law faculty at the University of Vienna and spent the next several years teaching finance and political economy both in seminars and lectures to a growing number of students. In 1873, he received the university's chair of economic theory at the very young age of 33.

In 1876 Menger began tutoring Archduke Rudolf von Habsburg, the Crown Prince of Austria in political economy and statistics. For two years, Menger accompanied the prince during his travels, first through continental Europe and then later through the British Isles. He is also thought to have assisted the crown prince in the composition of a pamphlet, published anonymously in 1878, which was highly critical of the higher Austrian aristocracy. His association with the prince would last until Rudolf's suicide in 1889.

In 1878 Rudolf's father, Emperor Franz Joseph, appointed Menger to the chair of political economy at Vienna. The title of Hofrat was conferred on him, and he was appointed to the Austrian  in 1900.

Dispute with the historical school 
Ensconced in his professorship, he set about refining and defending the positions he took and methods he utilized in Principles, the result of which was the 1883 publication of Investigations into the Method of the Social Sciences with Special Reference to Economics. The book caused a firestorm of debate, during which members of the historical school of economics began to derisively call Menger and his students the "Austrian School" to emphasize their departure from mainstream German economic thought  – the term was specifically used in an unfavorable review by Gustav von Schmoller.

In 1884 Menger responded with the pamphlet The Errors of Historicism in German Economics and launched the infamous , or methodological debate, between the Historical School and the Austrian School. During this time Menger began to attract like-minded disciples who would go on to make their own mark on the field of economics, most notably Eugen von Böhm-Bawerk, and Friedrich von Wieser.

In the late 1880s, Menger was appointed to head a commission to reform the Austrian monetary system. Over the course of the next decade, he authored a plethora of articles which would revolutionize monetary theory, including "The Theory of Capital" (1888) and "Money" (1892). Largely due to his pessimism about the state of German scholarship, Menger resigned his professorship in 1903 to concentrate on study.

Philosophical influences
There are different opinions on Menger's philosophical influences. But it is without discussion that there is a rudimentary dispute of Menger with Plato and a very meticulous one with Aristotle, especially with his ethics.

"Plato holds that money is an agreed sign for change and Aristotle says, that money came into being as an agreement, not by nature, but by law."

Also, the influence of Kant is provable. Many authors emphasize also rationalism and idealism, as is represented by Christian Wolff. Looking at the literature, most writers think that Menger represents an essential Aristotelian position. This is surprisingly a position that is contrary to his theory of the subjective value and his individualistic methodological position.

Another entry is the use of deduction or induction.  With his price theory can be shown that Menger is nominalistic and, stronger, anti-essentialistic. That is to say that his approach is inductionalistic.

Economics

Menger used his subjective theory of value to arrive at what he considered one of the most powerful insights in economics: "both sides gain from exchange". Unlike William Jevons, Menger did not believe that goods provide "utils," or units of utility. Rather, he wrote, goods are valuable because they serve various uses whose importance differs. Menger also came up with an explanation of how money develops that is still accepted by some schools of thought today.

Money 
Menger believed that gold and silver were the precious metals that were adopted as money for their unique attributes like costliness, durability, and easy preservation, making them the "most popular vehicle for hoarding as well as the goods most highly favoured in commerce."  Menger showed that "their special saleableness" tended to make their bid-ask spread tighter than any other market good, which led to their adoption as a general medium of exchange and evolution in many societies as money.

Works
 1871 – Principles of Economics
 1883 – Investigations into the Method of the Social Sciences with Special Reference to Economics
 1884 – The Errors of Historicism in German Economics
 1888 – The Theory of Capital
 1892 – On the Origins of Money

See also
 Methodenstreit
 History of macroeconomic thought
Historical school of economics

References

Further reading
 Ebeling, Richard M., "Carl Menger and the Sesquicentennial Founding of the Austrian School," American Institute for Economic Research, January 5, 2021
 Ebeling, Richard M., "Carl Menger's Theory of Institutions and Market Processes," American Institute for Economic Research, April 13, 202
 
 
 von Wieser, Friedrich, "Carl Menger: A Biographical Appreciation" [1923], American Institute for Economic Research, February 25, 2019

External links

 The Epistemological Import of Carl Menger's Theory of the Origin of Money Ludwig von Mises in Human Action on Menger's Theory of the Origins of Money
 Profile on Carl Menger at the History of Economic Thought Website
 Principles of Economics , online version provided by the Ludwig von Mises Institute.
 Grundsätze der Volkswirtschaftslehre (Principles of Economics)
 Principles of Economics (PDF Spanish)
 On the Origin of Money (English Translation), online version provided by the Monadnock Press
 Carl Menger Papers, 1857–1985, Rubenstein Library, Duke University
 

1840 births
1921 deaths
20th-century Austrian economists
19th-century Austrian economists
19th-century Austrian writers
Austrian School economists
Charles University alumni
University of Vienna alumni
Jagiellonian University alumni
Edlers of Austria
German Bohemian people
Austrian people of German Bohemian descent
People from the Kingdom of Galicia and Lodomeria
People from Nowy Sącz
Neoclassical economists